Silver Peak is a company that develops products for wide area networks (WANs), including WAN optimization and SD-WAN (Software-Defined WAN).  The company was founded in 2004 by David Hughes. Silver Peak shipped its first product, the NX-series hardware appliance, in September 2005, and their first SD-WAN solution, EdgeConnect, in June 2015.

On July 13, 2020, Hewlett Packard Enterprise announced its intent to acquire Silver Peak for $925 Million. This acquisition was completed on September 21, 2020, with Silver Peak becoming part of HPE subsidiary  Aruba Networks.

Products and services 

As of 2019, Silver Peak's major product lines are:

 WAN optimization
 NX series network appliances
 VX series virtual appliances
 GMS Global Management System — Management software for NX and VX
 Unity
 Unity EdgeConnect — Physical and virtual appliances for SD-WAN implementation
 Unity Boost — Optional WAN optimization package
 Unity Orchestrator — Management software/service, available as a virtual appliance, cloud-hosted, or Software as a service (SaaS) subscription

Partnerships

Dell 
Silver Peak is a Dell partner for WAN optimization in over 30 countries, where Dell resells Silver Peak to improve the performance of Dell storage (EqualLogic and Compellent), networking (Force10), server, and virtual desktop (VDI) implementations over the wide area network.

VMware 
Silver Peak partners with VMware to offer its virtual WAN optimization products as part of the VMware vCloud Air offering.

EMC 
EMC Corporation resells Silver Peak physical and virtual WAN optimization appliances, which are available through the EMC Select program. Silver Peak is also the only WAN optimization product qualified and integrated with EMC’s VPLEX Geo.  Silver Peak’s WAwan optimization products are E-lab qualified on Symmetrix Remote Data Facility/Asynchronous (SRDF/A), Symmetrix Remote Data Facility/Data Mobility (SRDF/DM), SAN Copy, Celerra Replicator, Isilon SyncIQ, RecoverPoint, and Atmos.

Hitachi Data Systems 
Hitachi Data Systems (HDS) resells Silver Peak's WAN optimization products.  Silver Peak can be deployed with HDS backup and replication products.

See also 
 WAN optimization
 Virtual appliance

References 

2004 establishments in California
2020 disestablishments in California
2020 mergers and acquisitions
American companies established in 2004
American companies disestablished in 2020
Companies based in California
Computer companies established in 2004
Computer companies disestablished in 2020
Defunct computer companies of the United States
Defunct computer hardware companies
Defunct software companies of the United States
Electronics companies established in 2004
Electronics companies disestablished in 2020
Networking hardware companies
WAN optimization